Vasudeva Sarvabhauma ( Sanskrit: वासुदेव सर्वभौम )  was an Indian Philosopher and a scholar of Nyaya Shastra. He is also known as Sarvabhauma Bhattacharya. He lived around 13th to 14th century of the Common Era. He belonged to Nabadwip and went to Mithila for studying Nyaya Shastra in Ancient Mithila University. He was a student of Pakshadhara Mishra, the head professor of Nyaya Shastra in the Ancient Mithila University at that time. He memorized the entire texts of learning available there and then returned to Nabadwip to establish his own school for the study of logic ( Navya Nyaya or New Logic ) He was one of the founders of Navya Nyaya School of Indian Philosophy.

Early life 
Vasudeva Sarvabhauma was born in a Brahmin family at Vidyanagar about four kilometres from Nabadwip town of Nadia district of present West Bengal. His father name was Maheshvara Visarada.

References 

Indian philosophy
Indian philosophers
Indian philosophers by century
Mithila
Nyaya